Merrill G. White (December 13, 1901 – March 21, 1959) was an American film editor and screenwriter. He also co-directed the 1957 film Ghost Diver. During the 1930s he worked in Britain, including on several films made by Herbert Wilcox.

Selected filmography
 The Broken Gate (1927)
 Monte Carlo (1930)
 Paramount on Parade (1930)
 Playboy of Paris (1930)
 The Vagabond King (1930)
 The Smiling Lieutenant (1931)
 The Doctor's Secret (1931)
 That's a Good Girl (1933)
 The Queen's Affair (1934)
 Brewster's Millions (1935)
 Peg of Old Drury (1935)
 The Amazing Quest of Ernest Bliss (1936)
 Talk of the Devil (1936)
 The Frog (1937)
 Sunset in Vienna (1937)
 Nurse Edith Cavell (1939)
 The Red House (1947)
 The Boy from Indiana (1950)
 The Girl on the Bridge (1951)
 Lady in the Iron Mask (1952)
 Red Snow (1952)
 Strange Fascination (1952)
 Circus of Love (1954)
 The Brave One (1956)
 Ghost Diver (1957)

References

Bibliography
 David Stenn. Clara Bow: Runnin' Wild. Rowman & Littlefield, 2000.

External links

1901 births
1959 deaths
20th-century American screenwriters
American film editors